Vandazhippuzha River is one of the tributaries of the river Gayathripuzha. It gets its name since it flows through the village of Vandazhi in Palakkad district. It has its origin from Nelliyampathy hills and joins Gayathri river near Alathur. Gayathripuzha is one of the main  tributaries of the  Bharathapuzha River, the second-longest river in Kerala, south India.

See also
Bharathapuzha - Main river
Gayathripuzha - One of the main  tributaries of the river Bharathapuzha

Other tributaries of the river Gayathripuzha
Mangalam river
Ayalurpuzha
Vandazhippuzha
Meenkarappuzha
Chulliyar

Bharathappuzha